Ángel Giménez (born 10 October 1955) is a former professional tennis player from Spain.

Career
Giménez twice made the second round in the singles draw of a Grand Slam draw, both times in 1981. At the French Open he defeated Bolivian Mario Martinez, before losing to Paul Torre. Then at Wimbledon that year he had a win over Jörgen Windahl and was then beaten by Andrew Pattison in five sets. His best doubles performance came in the 1981 French Open, when he and Ricardo Cano reached the third round. He never competed in the Australian Open or US Open.

He won two titles on the Grand Prix tennis circuit, at Vienna in 1980 and then the British Hard Court Championships later that year. As a doubles player he reached three finals, but lost them all. He had one of the best wins of his career in 1981 when he defeated Vitas Gerulaitis at Hamburg.

In the Davis Cup, Giménez took part in seven ties for Spain, from 1976 to 1982. The Spaniard won six of his 10 rubbers, two in singles and four in doubles.

As a coach he has worked with many players, including Gabriela Sabatini, Arantxa Sanchez Vicario, Svetlana Kuznetsova and Daniela Hantuchová. He now works at the Academia Sanchez-Casal in Barcelona, Spain.

Career finals

Singles: 3 (2–1)

Doubles: 3 (0–3)

References

External links
 
 

1955 births
Living people
Spanish male tennis players
Spanish tennis coaches
Tennis players from Barcelona
Mediterranean Games gold medalists for Spain
Mediterranean Games silver medalists for Spain
Mediterranean Games medalists in tennis
Competitors at the 1975 Mediterranean Games
20th-century Spanish people